St. Peter's Methodist Episcopal Church is a historic Methodist Episcopal church located at Hopewell, Somerset County, Maryland. It is a large single-story gable-front Gothic Revival frame church with four-story bell tower.  It was built in 1850 and extensively reworked in 1901.  Also on the property is a cemetery with 19th and 20th century markers.

It was listed on the National Register of Historic Places in 1990.

References

External links
, including photo in 1985, at Maryland Historical Trust

Methodist churches in Maryland
Churches on the National Register of Historic Places in Maryland
Churches in Somerset County, Maryland
Churches completed in 1850
19th-century Methodist church buildings in the United States
Carpenter Gothic church buildings in Maryland
National Register of Historic Places in Somerset County, Maryland